Italy competed at the 1972 Summer Olympics in Munich, West Germany. 224 competitors, 197 men and 27 women, took part in 123 events in 19 sports.

Medalists

Gold
 Klaus Dibiasi — Diving, Men's 10m Platform
 Graziano Mancinelli — Equestrian, Jumping Individual Competition
 Rolando Rigoli, Cesare Salvadori, Michele Maffei, Mario Aldo Montano, and Mario Tullio Montano — Fencing, Men's Sabre Team Competition
 Antonella Ragno-Lonzi — Fencing, Women's Foil Individual Competition
 Angelo Scalzone — Shooting, Trap Individual Competition

Silver
 Giorgio Cagnotto — Diving, Men's 3m Springboard
 Alessandro Argenton — Equestrian, Three-Day Event Individual Competition
 Novella Calligaris — Swimming, Women's 400m Freestyle

Bronze
 Pietro Mennea — Athletics, Men's 200m 
 Paola Pigni — Athletics, Women's 1.500m 
 Giorgio Cagnotto — Diving, Men's 10m Platform
 Anselmo Silvino — Weightlifting, Men's Middleweight
 Raimondo D'Inzeo, Piero D'Inzeo, Vittorio Orlandi, and Graziano Mancinelli — Equestrian, Jumping Team Competition
 Silvano Basagni — Shooting, Trap Individual Competition
 Novella Calligaris — Swimming, Women's 800m Freestyle 
 Novella Calligaris — Swimming, Women's 400m Individual Medley 
 Giuseppe Bognanni — Wrestling, Men's Greco-Roman Flyweight 
 Gian-Matteo Ranzi — Wrestling, Men's Greco-Roman Lightweight

Archery

In the first modern archery competition at the Olympics, Italy entered three men. Their highest placing competitor was Alfredo Massazza, at 31st place.

Men's Individual Competition:
 Alfredo Massazza - 2340 points (→ 31st place)
 Giancarlo Ferrari - 2322 points (→ 33rd place)
 Sante Spigarelli - 2300 points (→ 35th place)

Athletics

Men's 800 metres
Franco Arese
 Heat — DNS (→ did not advance)

Men's 1500 metres
Franco Arese
 Heat — 3:44.0
 Semifinals — 3:41.1 (→ did not advance)
Gianni del Buono
 Heat — 3:40.8
 Semifinals — 3:42.0 (→ did not advance)

Men's 4 × 100 m Relay
Vincenzo Guerini, Ennio Preatoni, Luigi Benedetti, and Pietro Mennea
 Heat — 39.29s 
 Semifinals — 39.21s
 Final — 39.14s (→ 8th place)

Men's High Jump
Enzo del Forno 
 Qualifying Round — 2.15m
 Final — 2.15m (→ 10th place)
Marco Schivo
 Qualifying Round — 2.15m
 Final — 2.10m (→ 17th place)

Basketball

Men's Team Competition
Preliminary Round (Group B)
Lost to Yugoslavia (78-85)
Defeated Senegal (92-56)
Lost to Soviet Union (66-79)
Defeated West Germany (68-57)
Defeated Poland (71-59)
Defeated Puerto Rico (71-54)
Defeated Philippines (101-81)
Semi Finals
Lost to United States (38-68)
Bronze Medal Match
Lost to Cuba (65-66) → Fourth place
Team Roster
Ottorino Flaborea
Giuseppe Brumatti
Giorgio Giomo
Mauro Cerioni
Massimo Masini
Renzo Bariviera
Marino Zanatta
Dino Meneghin
Pierluigi Marzorati
Luigi Serafini
Ivan Bisson
Giulio Iellini

Boxing

Men's Light Flyweight:
 Gaetano Curcetti
 1/16-Final - Lost to Kadir Syed Abdul of Singapore (3 round, RSC)

Men's Flyweight:
 Franco Udella
 1/16-Final - Defeated Filex Maina of Kenya (5 - 0)
 1/8-Final - Lost to Boris Zoriktuev of USSR (1 - 4)

Men's Featherweight:
 Pasqualino Morbidelli
 1/32-Final - Defeated Morgan Mwenya of Zambia (5 - 0)
 1/16-Final - Defeated Ebu Sef Tatar of Turkey (5 -0 )
 1/8-Final - Lost to Royal Kobayashi of Japan (1 round, KO)

Men's Lightweight:
 Giambattista Capretti
 1/32-Final - Defeated José Martinez of Canada (2 round, RSC)
 1/16-Final - Lost to László Orbán of Hungary (1 - 4)

Men's Light Welterweight:
 Ernesto Bergamasco
 1/16-Final - Lost to Srisook Bantow of Thailand (1 - 4)

Men's Welterweight:
 Damiano Lassandro
 1/32-Final - Lost to Emilio Correa of Cuba (0 - 5)

Men's Light Middleweight:
 Antonio Castellini
 1/16-Final - Lost to Wiesław Rudkowski of Poland (0 - 5)

Men's Light Heavyweight:
 Guglielmo Spinello
 1/16-Final - Defeated Samson Laizer of Tanzania (2round KO)
 1/8-Final - Lost to Rudi Hornig of West Germany (1 - 4)

Canoeing

Cycling

Fifteen cyclists represented Italy in 1972.

Individual road race
 Francesco Moser — 8th place
 Walter Riccomi — 49th place
 Aldo Parecchini — did not finish (→ no ranking)
 Franco Ongarato — did not finish (→ no ranking)

Team time trial
 Osvaldo Castellan
 Pasqualino Moretti
 Francesco Moser
 Giovanni Tonoli

Sprint
 Massimo Marino
 Ezio Cardi

1000m time trial
 Ezio Cardi
 Final — 1:07.80 (→ 9th place)

Tandem
 Dino Verzini and Giorgio Rossi → 9th place

Individual pursuit
 Luciano Borgognoni

Team pursuit
 Pietro Algeri
 Giacomo Bazzan
 Giorgio Morbiato
 Luciano Borgognoni

Diving

Men's 3m Springboard 
 Giorgio Cagnotto — 591.63 points (→  Silver Medal)
 Klaus Dibiasi — 559.05 points (→ 4th place)

Men's 10m Platform
 Klaus Dibiasi — 504.12 points (→  Gold Medal)
 Giorgio Cagnotto — 475.83 points (→  Bronze Medal)

Equestrian

Fencing

19 fencers, 14 men and 5 women, represented Italy in 1972.

Men's foil
 Nicola Granieri
 Stefano Simoncelli
 Arcangelo Pinelli

Men's team foil
 Alfredo Del Francia, Nicola Granieri, Carlo Montano, Arcangelo Pinelli, Stefano Simoncelli

Men's épée
 Nicola Granieri
 Claudio Francesconi
 Gianluigi Saccaro

Men's team épée
 Claudio Francesconi, Nicola Granieri, Gianluigi Placella, Gianluigi Saccaro, Pier Alberto Testoni

Men's sabre
 Michele Maffei
 Mario Aldo Montano
 Rolando Rigoli

Men's team sabre
 Michele Maffei, Rolando Rigoli, Cesare Salvadori, Mario Aldo Montano, Mario Tullio Montano

Women's foil
 Antonella Ragno-Lonzi
 Maria Consolata Collino
 Giulia Lorenzoni

Women's team foil
 Antonella Ragno-Lonzi, Giulia Lorenzoni, Der Reka Cipriani, Maria Consolata Collino, Giuseppina Bersani

Gymnastics

Judo

Modern pentathlon

Three male pentathletes represented Italy in 1972.

Men's Individual Competition:
 Mario Medda - 4850 points (→ 16th place)
 Giovanni Perugini - 4571 points (→ 34th place)
 Nicolo Deligia - 4492 points (→ 39th place)

Men's Team Competition:
 Medda, Perugini, and Deligia - 13913 points (→ 10th place)

Rowing

Men's Coxed Pairs
Giampaolo Tronchin, Mario Semenzato and Siro Kuhnke Meli
Heat — 8:02.79
Repechage — 8:10.46 (→ did not advance)

Sailing

Shooting

Eleven male shooters represented Italy in 1972. In the trap event, Angelo Scalzone won gold and Silvano Basagni won bronze.

25 m pistol
 Giovanni Liverzani
 Roberto Ferraris

50 m pistol
 Giuseppe De Chirico
 Piero Errani

50 m rifle, three positions
 Giuseppe De Chirico
 Walter Frescura

50 m rifle, prone
 Giovanni Mezzani
 Giancarlo Cecconi

Trap
 Angelo Scalzone
 Silvano Basagni

Skeet
 Romano Garagnani
 Carlo Alberto Lodi

Swimming

Men's 100m Freestyle
Roberto Pangaro
 Heat — 54.74s (→  did not advance)

Men's 200m Freestyle
Riccardo Targetti
 Heat — 2:02.58 (→  did not advance)
Arnaldo Cinquetti
 Heat — 2:01.78 (→  did not advance)
Roberto Pangaro
 Heat — 2:00.97 (→  did not advance)

Men's 4 × 100 m Freestyle Relay
Roberto Pangaro, Paolo Barelli, Marcello Guarducci and Alberto Castagnetti 
 Heat — 3:38.81 (→  did not advance)

Men's 4 × 200 m Freestyle Relay
Roberto Pangaro, Arnaldo Cinquetti, Lorenzo Marugo, and Riccardo Targetti
 Heat — 8:03.98 (→  did not advance)

Men's Competition
 Vincenzo Finocchiaro, Sergio Irredento, Massimo Nistri, Edmondo Mingione, Michele di Pietro, Angelo Tozzi, Gaetano Carboni, and Mauro Calligaris. Reserve: Sandro Grassi.

Women's Competition
 Laura Podestà, Novella Calligaris, Federica Stabilini, Patrizia Miserini, Donatella Talpo, Patrizia Lanfredini, Laura Gorgerino, and Alessandra Finesso. Reserve: Antonella Valentini.

Water polo

Men's Team Competition 
Preliminary Round (Group C)
 Lost to Soviet Union (1-4)
 Defeated Bulgaria (8-5)
 Defeated Spain (6-2)
 Defeated Japan (12-5)
Final Round (Group I)
 Lost to Hungary (7-8)
 Drew with Yugoslavia (6-6)
 Drew with West Germany (2-2)
 Lost to United States (5-6) → Sixth place
 Team Roster
 Alberto Alberani
 Eraldo Pizzo
 Roldano Simeoni
 Mario Cevasco
 Alessandro Ghibellini
 Gianni de Magistris
 Guglielmo Marsili
 Silvio Baracchini
 Franco Lavoratori
 Sante Marsili
 Ferdinande Ligano

Weightlifting

Men's Bantamweight:
 Gaetano Tosto - 325.0 kg (→ 16th place)

Men's Featherweight:
 Peppino Tanti - 372.5 kg (→ 8th place)

Men's Middleweight:
 Anselmo Silvino - 470.0 kg (→  Bronze Medal)
 Salvatore Laudani - 440.0 kg (→ 11th place)

Men's Light Heavyweight:
 Dino Turcato - 455.0 (→ 9th place)

Men's Heavyweight:
 Roberto Vezzani - 545.0 (→ 5th place)

Wrestling

Water Skiing (demonstration sports)

Men's Slalom:
 Roby Zucchi - 44.0 points (→  Gold Medal)

Men's Figure Skiing:
 Max Hofer - 3850 points (→ 6th place)
 Roby Zucchi - 3560 points (→ 8th place)

Men's Jump:
 Max Hofer - 37.70 points (→  Silver Medal)
 Roby Zucchi - 35.10 points (→ 7th place)

References

External links
 Italy at the 1972 Munich Summer Games
 

Nations at the 1972 Summer Olympics
1972 Summer Olympics
Olympics